Kenneth Reid (born 23 June 1955 in Belfast) is a Northern Irish journalist.  He retired as Political Editor at UTV on 31 March 2021.

Journalism career
Reid's career as a journalist began at The News Letter in 1977, where he remained for seven years.  This was followed by stints as the sports editor, and later editor, of the Sunday News from 1984 to 1987, and reporting for the Cork Examiner from 1987 to 1994.

Reid joined UTV in 1994.  He was one of two journalists at the station believed to have not been considered for a voluntary redundancy package at the station in late 2008.  Reid has blogged on UTV's website on political affairs in Northern Ireland since May 2008.

Honours
Reid received the honour of News Broadcaster of the Year at the CIPR Press and Broadcast Awards in 2005 and 2006.

Personal life
Reid studied at Methodist College Belfast and the University of Hull, becoming involved with the student newspaper at the latter institution.  He is married with three children.

Reid is a fan of Cliftonville, Everton and Rugby club Ballymena.

References

External links 
Ken Reid's politics blog on u.tv

1955 births
Living people
Journalists from Belfast
UTV (TV channel)
People educated at Methodist College Belfast
Columnists from Northern Ireland